Horace Webster (15 August 1888 – 22 February 1949) was an Australian rules footballer who played with South Melbourne and Essendon in the Victorian Football League (VFL).

Notes

External links 
		

1888 births
1949 deaths
Australian rules footballers from Tasmania
Sydney Swans players
Essendon Football Club players
City-South Football Club players